Dabral (ISO: Ḍabrāl), is a surname found in Hindu community of Garhwali Gangari Brahmins primarily living in the Garhwal region of Uttarakhand state of India. Member of this community are also found in Kumaon region.

According to their traditions they are the descendants of the sage Bharadwaja. Adherent of the Shaivism sect, they do worship Shiva as their prime deity.

Etymology

The word Dabral is a Middle Indo-Aryan word, derived from a village named Dabar, meaning "originated from Dabar". Dabar word is present in many modern Indo-Aryan languages meaning a small lake or pond in a country area. There are many villages named Dabar and its local variations like Dabra or Dabri scattered throughout Indian Subcontinent.

History

According to Rahul Sankrityayan's book Himalaya Parichaya: Garhwal, the Dabrals were originally inhabitants of Maharashtra state of the Western India region, from where they migrated to the Himalayas in the north as a result of the Islamic invasion in the 14th century A.D.

Same source cites that two Gaud Saraswat Brahmin brothers from Maharashtra named Raghunath and Vishwanath migrated to the Garhwal region in the year 1376 A.D. where they first settled at the hilly village Dabar in Pauri Garhwal district near the town Lansdowne in present-day Uttarakhand thus given the surname Dabral. Modern day Dabrals are considered their descendants.

Notable people with the name Dabral

Shivprasad Dabral Charan; historian and writer from Uttarakhand
Dabral Baba (born Govind Prasad Kukreti); Indian yogi and mystic
Manglesh Dabral; Indian poet

See also 

Sarola Brahmin
Garhwal Kingdom
Garhwali language

References 

Indian surnames
Surnames of Indian origin
Surnames of Hindustani origin
Hindu surnames
Himalayan peoples
Social groups of India
Social groups of Uttarakhand
Brahmin communities of Uttarakhand